Buddhabhadra (359-429 CE) was an Indian Buddhist monk, with the title of śramaṇa.

Buddhabhadra and his Chinese disciple Xuangao are known to have advocated the twin principles of samadhi (meditative concentration) and prajñā (wisdom). These were later inherited by the Tiantai school of Buddhism, and its patriarchs Nanyue Huisi and Zhiyi. Buddhabhadra's views, in turn, stemmed from those of Buddhasena's dhyāna school in Kashmir and their meditation manual was translated by Buddhabhadra at the behest of Huiyuan, the founder of the Chinese tradition of Pure Land Buddhism. This Indian meditation manual preserved in Taishō Tripiṭaka 618, and is typically called the Yogācārabhūmi Sūtra or the Dharmatrātadhyāna Sutra. This text was later prized by the Chan Buddhism in China, and parts of its lineage to the Buddha became entangled in sectarian conflicts between factions of Chinese Buddhism.

See also 
 Silk Road transmission of Buddhism
 Bodhidharma

References

Further reading
Hodge, Stephen (2009 & 2012). "The Textual Transmission of the Mahayana Mahaparinirvana-sutra"

359 births
Indian Buddhists
4th-century Buddhists
5th-century Buddhists
Indian Buddhist monks
Chinese Buddhist monks
Buddhist monks
Buddhist translators
429 deaths
Sanskrit–Chinese translators